The Little Eagle (Polish:Orlę) is a 1927 Polish silent comedy film directed by Wiktor Biegański and starring Oktawian Kaczanowski, Maria Majdrowicz and Nina Wilinska.

Cast
 Oktawian Kaczanowski as Janusz Kuklinski 
 Maria Majdrowicz as Halina Kuklinska 
 Nina Wilinska as Krzysia Kuklinska 
 Boleslaw Orlinski as Janek Kuklinski 
 Jadwiga Daczynska as Ms. Zahorska 
 Zdzisław Czermanski as Wiktor Zahorski 
 Kurt R. Kurthoff as Hubert Stonor 
 Hanka Ordonówna as Dancer, Stonor's friend 
 Nora Ney as Panna sklepowa 
 Lech Owron as Janosik 
 Koszutski-Girls as Dancers

References

Bibliography
Skaff, Sheila. The Law of the Looking Glass: Cinema in Poland, 1896–1939. Ohio University Press, 2008.

External links

1927 films
1927 comedy films
Polish comedy films
Polish silent films
1920s Polish-language films
Films directed by Wiktor Bieganski
Polish black-and-white films